The National Green Tribunal Act, 2010 is an Act of the Parliament of India which enables the creation of a special tribunal to handle the expeditious disposal of the cases pertaining to environmental issues.  It draws inspiration from India's constitutional provision of (Constitution of India/Part III) Article 21 Protection of life and personal liberty, which assures the citizens of India the right to a healthy environment.

Definition 
The legislate Act of Parliament defines the National Green Tribunal Act, 2010 as follows:

An Act to provide for the establishment of a National Green Tribunal for the effective and expeditious disposal of cases relating to environmental protection and conservation of forests and other natural resources including enforcement of any legal right relating to environment and giving relief and compensation for damages to persons and property and for matters connected therewith or incidental thereto.

The Tribunal's dedicated jurisdiction in environmental matters shall provide speedy environmental justice and help reduce the burden of litigation in the higher courts. The Tribunal shall not be bound by the procedure laid down under the Code of Civil Procedure, 1908, but shall be guided by principles of natural justice. The tribunal is mandated to make and endeavour for disposal of applications or appeals finally within 6 months of the filing of the same. Initially, the NGT is proposed to be set up at five places of sittings and will follow circuit procedure for making itself more accessible; New Delhi is the Principal Place of Sitting of the Tribunal and Bhopal, Pune, Kolkata and Chennai shall be the other place of sitting of the Tribunal.

Origin 
During the summit of United Nations Conference on Environment and Development in June 1992, India vowed the participating states to provide judicial and administrative remedies to the victims of the pollutants and other environmental damage.

There lie many reasons behind the setting up of this tribunal. After India's move with carbon credits, such tribunal may play a vital role in ensuring the control of emissions and maintaining the desired levels. This is the first body of its kind that is required by its parent statute to apply the polluter pays principle and the principle of sustainable development.

India is the third country following Australia and New Zealand to have such a system.
Delhi Pollution Control Committee (DPCC) works under the act of (NGT).

Structure 
The five regional benches are at New Delhi (North), Pune (West), Bhopal (Central), Chennai (South) and Kolkata (East). Each Bench has a specified geographical jurisdiction in a region. Further, a mechanism for circuit benches is also available. For example, the Southern Zone bench, which is based in Chennai, can decide to have sittings in other places like Bangalore or Hyderabad.
but National green tribunal act 2010
The Chairperson of the NGT is a retired Judge of the Supreme Court, headquartered in New Delhi. On 18 October 2010, Justice Lokeshwar Singh Panta became its first Chairman. Retired justice Adarsh Kumar Goel is the incumbent chairman also on 15th Jan 22 Afroz Ahmad take charge as a Member in Principal bench Delhi  Other Judicial members are retired Judges of High Courts. Each bench of the NGT will comprise at least one Judicial Member and one Expert Member. Expert members should have a professional qualification and a minimum of 15 years of experience in the field of environment/forest conservation and related subjects.the member are not reelected

See also
Central Pollution Control Board
Environmental issues in India

References

External links 
 
 
 

Indian Tribunals
India and the United Nations
Environmental law in India
2010 in the environment
Acts of the Parliament of India 2010
Manmohan Singh administration
Right to a healthy environment